Zhuhai Xiang Zhang Secondary School, formerly Zhuhai Girls' Middle School (ZHGS, from Pinyin: ZHNZZX), is a secondary school for girls in Xiangzhou District, Zhuhai, Guangdong, China. It includes both junior high school and senior high school levels and has a dormitory. It is the only private girls' school in China as of 2011. It is also called Henglong Girls' Middle School.

History
It opened in September 2011, making it the first girls' only school in Guangdong province in the modern era. It began enrolling students the previous March, and half of its slots filled after 10 days despite what the Beijing Review characterized as high tuition fees. Zhuhai Henglong Group invested 100 million renminbi ($15 million U.S. dollars) into the school. The company is a real estate firm that operates other private schools.

At one time QSI International School of Zhuhai was on the Girls' Middle campus.

Student body
 70% of the students originated from the Pearl River Delta and most of the students were from well-to-do backgrounds.

Operations
In 2011 the per-semester costs for junior high school, senior high school, and international high school levels were 26,600 RMB ($4,030 U.S.), 28,000-34,000 RMB ($4,242-$5,152 U.S.) and up to 61,000 RMB ($9,242 U.S.), respectively.

Academics and activities
Courses include home economics, foreign languages (in which students may take two different ones at a time), exercise, and self-defense.

It offers nighttime yoga classes and morning exercise classes.

Reception
In 2010 there was debate over the school, with some championing its female-oriented programming and others criticizing separating girls from boys.

See also
 List of girls' schools

References

External links
 Zhuhai Xiang Zhang Secondary School 

Girls' schools in China
Boarding schools in China
High schools in Guangdong
Private schools in Guangdong

Buildings and structures in Zhuhai